The Maltese freshwater crab is a subspecies of freshwater crab, endemic to certain areas within the Maltese Islands. It is very rare and its numbers have been decreasing in recent years.

General features

It is greenish-grey with some occasional orange-yellow patches, and an overall purple hue on the legs.

Habitat
The Maltese freshwater crab is found where fresh water / running water is present throughout the year although it does live near pools and springs too.

When threatened, the crab takes shelter by hiding under rocks or stones in the water and among vegetation, or by entering the burrows it digs. These burrows are dug in mud or clay and can be more than 50 cm deep. Part of the burrow is normally flooded.

Food
The Maltese freshwater crab is carnivorous and feeds on other smaller animals such as tadpoles. It usually feeds after sunset.

Population
The numbers of this freshwater crab are steadily declining as a result of pollution of water, drying up of streams and because of its capture by humans.

See also
 Endemic Maltese wildlife

References
SCIBERRAS, A., SCIBERRAS, J. & VELLA, S. (2009) On the Occurrence of a New Population of Potamon Fluviatile Lanfrancoi at Wied Ghajn Zejtuna,Mellieħa. The Central Mediterranean Naturalist 5(1)24-27. Nature Trust Malta publications

SCIBERRAS, A. & SCIBERRAS, J. (2010) An Ecological Survey On The Valley Of Wied Għajn Żejtuna. Commissioned by Ghaqda tar-Residenti ta’ Santa Marija Estate. 42pgs

Potamoidea
Freshwater crustaceans of Europe
Fauna of Malta
Endemic fauna of Malta